The following is the discography of Less Than Jake, a Florida-based ska punk band.

Less Than Jake's first full-length LP Pezcore debuted in August 1995, featuring such staples as "Liquor Store" and "My Very Own Flag", originally on Dill Records. Shortly following the release of Pezcore, the band was signed to Capitol Records. They debuted on the major label in 1996 with Losing Streak. The album was full of the band's wry, fast-paced brand of ska-punk anthems, producing such fan favorites as "Johnny Quest Thinks We're Sellouts," "Jen Doesn't Like Me Anymore," and "Automatic".

In 1998 the band released Hello Rockview, one of their most acclaimed albums. In September 2000, the band released Borders & Boundaries. While it was neither as commercially successful or as musically appreciated as previous releases initially, the album was a display of significant growth for the band, showcasing much more mature music than the band had ever shown before. Still, the album provided fans with two instant hits in "Look What Happened" (which received minor airplay on college stations) and their hometown anthem, "Gainesville Rock City" (which received some airtime on MTV2).

Less Than Jake returned to major label status with their next album Anthem, releasing the 2003 LP on Warner Bros./Sire Records. It featured hit singles in both the US and the UK, with "She's Gonna Break Soon" (which spent a couple weeks on TRL), "The Science Of Selling Yourself Short" (#36 on the Billboard Modern Rock Tracks chart). The DVD retrospective "The People's History of Less Than Jake" appeared a month later, featuring both professional and bootleg recordings of the band, as well as home movies of the members' own creation.

In April 2006, the band released the four-song EP, Absolution for Idiots and Addicts, followed a month later with their next full-length, In with the Out Crowd, on Sire Records. The album, while still receiving generally positive reviews, was viewed far more negatively than compared to previous albums. On June 24, 2008 the band released their latest studio album, GNV FLA, on their own label Sleep It Off Records. This album was widely viewed as a welcomed return to the sound and musical style heard on their early records.

In 2011, members of the band stated their distaste for full-length studio albums, and suggested that the band will be releasing only EPs in the future. The band subsequently released Greetings from Less Than Jake in 2011 and its follow-up, Seasons Greetings from Less Than Jake in 2012.

Albums

Studio albums

Live albums

Compilation albums

Demos

EPs

7" vinyl

Singles 

Notes
 A  Released as a promotional single only.
 B  Released in the UK only.

Other charting songs

Compilation appearances

Video releases

Music videos

References

Discographies of American artists
Rock music group discographies